Brian Walsh may refer to:

Brian Walsh (English footballer) (1932–2001), English footballer
Brian Walsh (footballer, born 1934) (1934–2010), Australian rules footballer for St Kilda
Brian Walsh (footballer, born 1951), Australian rules footballer for Carlton and Essendon
Brian Walsh (horseracing), Irish racehorse owner
Brian Walsh (ice hockey) (born 1954), major league ice hockey player with the Calgary Cowboys
Brian Walsh (judge) (1918–1998), Irish supreme court judge
Brian Walsh (politician) (born 1972), Fine Gael politician and mayor of Galway
Brian Walsh (rugby union) (born 1969), Irish rugby union player and coach

See also
Brian Walshe, suspect in the disappearance of Ana Walshe
Bryan Walsh, Lord Mayor of Brisbane, Australia, 1975–1976